Franz Boluminski (12 November 1863 – 28 April 1913) was a German colonial administrator.

Boluminski was born in  Graudenz, Province of Prussia. He served in the German Army in German East Africa and in 1894 went to work for the German New Guinea Company at Astrolabe Bay near modern-day Madang in Papua New Guinea.

In March 1899 he transferred into the German colonial service and was posted to new station of Kavieng on the island of New Ireland. In 1910 he was promoted to district officer.

His major feat was the construction of a road along the north-eastern coast of the island. He made each village along the coast construct a section and then maintain it. The road eventually became known as the Boluminski Highway, named in his honour.

At the same time he established copra plantations connected to the highway and this made New Ireland one of the most profitable parts of German New Guinea.

He died of heat-stroke and is now buried in Bagail Cemetery in Kavieng.

1863 births
1913 deaths
People from Grudziądz
People from the Province of Prussia
Schutztruppe personnel
History of Papua New Guinea
Colonial people of German East Africa
People of former German colonies
Colonial people of German New Guinea